Ahti Heinla (born 2 May 1972) is an Estonian computer programmer and businessman. He is one of the developers of Skype.

He was also an organizer of Let's Do It 2008, a civic action with 50,000 volunteers participating in cleaning up the countryside of Estonia in one day.

He was a recipient of the 2008 Estonian Volunteer of the Year national award.

He has been a member of the board at the nature protection NGO Estonian Fund for Nature since 2006.

Heinla speaks Estonian, English and Spanish.

In 2013 and 2014, he participated on NASA Centennial Challenge as team leader for Team Kuukulgur.

Heinla and Janus Friis founded Starship Technologies in 2014, to develop small self-driving delivery robots. He is the CEO and CTO.

References

1972 births
Living people
Estonian computer programmers
Estonian businesspeople
Skype people
Recipients of the Order of the White Star, 5th Class